Jang clan of Asan was one of the Korean clans. Their Bon-gwan was in Asan, South Chungcheong Province. According to the research in 2000, the number of Jang clan of Asan was 17695. Their founder was  who served as Jinzi Guanglu Daifu in Song dynasty.  insisted that he would resist Jin dynasty if Wanyan Zongyao in Jin dynasty invaded Song dynasty, but his claim was not accepted. Then, he exiled himself to Goryeo and was appointed as Prince of Asan from Yejong of Goryeo. Finally, he began Jang clan of Asan and made Asan their Bon-gwan.

See also 
 Korean clan names of foreign origin

References

External links